Minute triplefin is a common name for several fishes and may refer to:

Enneapterygius minutus
Enneapterygius philippinus

Enneapterygius